The women's 800 metres event at the 1983 Pan American Games was held in Caracas, Venezuela on 23 and 24 August.

Medalists

Results

Heats

Final

References

Athletics at the 1983 Pan American Games
1983